Gigi Hozimah (born 15 February 1982 in Mecca, Saudi Arabia) is a Saudi-American film director. Her most notable work is He Belongs To Us.

Hozimah moved to England in 2002 to study cinema, and received a master's degree in filmmaking from Kingston University. In 2013, she founded her production company, Look At The Wall Productions, in New York City. 

Hozimah's feature debut He Belongs To Us (2017), is a psychological horror film shot on location in New York City. "He Belongs to Us" was selected in several film festivals, including Newfilmmakers NY Festival in 2018, and was screened at several independent cinemas. 

Her second feature, arthouse drama That Abandoned Place (2020) was written and directed by Hozimah, and filmed on-location in New York City and Philadelphia. "That Abandoned Place" premiered in Philadelphia in November, 2021.

Films 
 Happy Birthday (short)
 Window (short)
 Little Adult (short)
 Blue Sweater (short)
 Chess Player (short documentary)
 He Belongs to Us (feature)
 That Abandoned Place (feature)

References

External links

1982 births
Living people
People from Mecca
Saudi Arabian women film directors
Alumni of Kingston University